Ropica nigrovittata is a species of beetle in the family Cerambycidae. It was described by Breuning in 1940. It is known from Borneo.

References

nigrovittata
Beetles described in 1940